Motohiko (written: 元彦 or 基彦) is a masculine Japanese given name. Notable people with the name include:

 (1905-1998), Japanese ski jumper
Motohiko Eguchi, Japanese Judo athlete
Motohiko Hino,(1946–1999) Japanese jazz drummer
 (born 1954), Japanese writer
 (born 1954), Japanese politician
 (born 1999), Japanese football player
 (born 1977), Japanese politician 

Japanese masculine given names